Wellington Municipal Airport  is a small American airport three miles north of Wellington, Kansas, in Sumner County.

The airport's Federal Aviation Administration three-letter location identifier is EGT and it has no International Air Transport Association code.

Facilities
Its one runway, 17/35, is 4,201 by 100 feet (1,280 x 30 m) concrete.

In the year ending November 19, 2008 the airport had 18,050 aircraft operations, an average of 49 per day: 99.7% general aviation and 0.3% military. That year 34 aircraft were based at the airport, of which 94% were single-engine and 6% multi-engine.

References

External links 
 Aerial image as of 20 March 1996 from USGS The National Map via MSR Maps
 
 

Airports in Kansas
Buildings and structures in Sumner County, Kansas